The Pandectists were German university legal scholars in the early 19th century who studied and taught Roman law as a model of what they called Konstruktionsjurisprudenz (conceptual jurisprudence) as codified in the Pandects of Justinian (Berman).

Beginning in the mid-19th century, the Pandectists were attacked in arguments by noted jurists Julius Hermann von Kirchmann and Rudolf von Jhering, who favored a modern approach of law as a practical means to an end (Weber).

In the United States, Oliver Wendell Holmes Jr. and other legal realists pushed for laws based on what judges and the courts actually did, rather than the historical and conceptual or academic law of Friedrich Carl von Savigny and the Pandectists (Rosenberg).

See also
Corpus Juris Civilis
Law of Germany
Civil code
Roman law

References 
 Law and Revolution: The Formation of the Western Legal Tradition Harold J. Berman, Harvard, 1983
 On Charisma and Institution Building Max Weber, U. Chicago, 1968
 The Hidden Holmes: His Theory of Torts in History David Rosenberg, Harvard, 1996

External links
  Civil Law Codification in the German-Speaking States of Northern and Central Europe
 The "Science" of Legal Science

 p
Roman law
Legal history of Germany
Philosophy of law